André Maginot (17 February 1877 – 7 January 1932) was a French civil servant, soldier, and Member of Parliament. He is best known for his advocacy of the string of forts known as the Maginot Line.

Early years, to World War I 
Maginot was born and grew up in Paris, but spent extended vacations in Revigny-sur-Ornain, the village of his forebears. The village was situated in the part of the Lorraine that had not in 1871 been annexed to Germany. After taking the civil service exam in 1897, Maginot began a career in the French bureaucracy that would last the rest of his life. He worked as the assistant of the Governor-General in Algeria until 1910, when he resigned and began his political career. He was elected to the Chamber of Deputies that year and served as Under-Secretary of State for War prior to the outbreak of World War I in 1914.

When the war began, Maginot enlisted in the army and was posted along the Lorraine front. In November 1914, Maginot (by now promoted to sergeant for his "coolness and courage") was wounded in the leg near Verdun (he would walk with a limp for the rest of his life). For extreme valor, he was awarded the Médaille militaire. He was also a fencer.

Development of the Maginot Line 
After World War I, Maginot returned to the Chamber of Deputies and served in a number of government posts, including Minister of Overseas France (20 March 1917 – 12 September 1917, 11 November 1928 – 3 November 1929), Minister of Pensions starting in 1920  and Minister of War (1922–1924, 1929–1930, 1931–1932). He believed the Treaty of Versailles did not provide France with sufficient security. He pushed for more funds for defense and grew more distrustful of Germany during a period when few in France wanted to think about the possibility of another war.

Maginot came to advocate building a series of defensive fortifications along France's border with Germany that would include a combination of field positions and permanent concrete forts. He was influenced in this decision by his observations of successful fortifications employed at Verdun in World War I. He was also probably influenced by the destruction of his home in Revigny-sur-Ornain, which made him determined to prevent Lorraine from ever being invaded again.

In 1926 Maginot was successful in getting the government to allocate money to build several experimental sections of the defensive line. During a debate concerning the budget in 1926, André Maginot lobbied heavily for the money needed to construct the enormous line of fortifications. He was finally able to persuade Parliament to allocate 3.3 billion francs for the project (the upper house voted 274 to 26 in favor of the project a few days later).

Work on the project progressed rapidly. Maginot visited a work site in October 1930 and expressed satisfaction with the work. He was especially pleased with the work in Lorraine, site of the home where he spent his childhood, and fought for more funding for construction in that area. Though Maginot was the main proponent for the project, most of the actual designs for the Maginot line were the work of Paul Painlevé, Maginot's successor as Minister of War.

Death

André Maginot never saw the line completed; he became ill in December 1931 and died in Paris on 7 January 1932 of typhoid fever. Many people mourned him throughout France and it was only after his death that the line of defences which he advocated came to bear his name. In World War II, Germany was able to circumvent the line by passing its Panzers through hills and marshlands which had been impenetrable to tanks when Maginot made his recommendations. A monument in memory of André Maginot was dedicated near Verdun in September 1966.

Quote 
We could hardly dream of building a kind of Great Wall of France, which would in any case be far too costly. Instead we have foreseen powerful but flexible means of organizing defense, based on the dual principle of taking full advantage of the terrain and establishing a continuous line of fire everywhere.
–10 December 1929

See also 
 French Third Republic

References

External links 

 A biography of Maginot (Archived 2009-10-25)
 

1877 births
1932 deaths
Politicians from Paris
Democratic Republican Alliance politicians
Democratic and Social Action politicians
French Ministers of War
French Ministers of Overseas France
French Ministers of Pensions
Members of the 10th Chamber of Deputies of the French Third Republic
Members of the 11th Chamber of Deputies of the French Third Republic
Members of the 12th Chamber of Deputies of the French Third Republic
Members of the 13th Chamber of Deputies of the French Third Republic
Members of the 14th Chamber of Deputies of the French Third Republic
Military history of France
French Army soldiers
French military personnel of World War I